My First Wedding can refer to:

 My First Wedding (2006 film), a 2006 American film
 My First Wedding (2011 film), a 2011 Argentine film